The Loening R-4 was a racer aircraft built by Loening in the early 1920s.

Design
The R-4 featured a low-wing monoplane layout, and the Packard engine weighed three times the size of the aircraft and took up a quarter length of the R-4, nicknamed the "flying engine". Both R-4 racers (AS68559 and AS68560) were entered in the 1922 Pulitzer Trophy race with poor results, being reported as "almost total flops".

Operators

United States Army Air Service

Specifications

References

 

1920s United States sport aircraft
Low-wing aircraft
Single-engined tractor aircraft
Aircraft first flown in 1922
R-4